Ana Maria Stanciu (born 6 July 1987) is a Romanian footballer who plays as a defender. She has been a member of the Romania women's national team.

References

1987 births
Living people
Women's association football defenders
Romanian women's footballers
Romania women's international footballers
Apollon Ladies F.C. players
Romanian expatriate footballers
Romanian expatriate sportspeople in Cyprus
Expatriate women's footballers in Cyprus